Anita Ford (born October 3, 1947) is a Canadian curler and curling coach from Regina, Saskatchewan. She is known as the alternate and later coach of the Sandra Schmirler team.

She is a two-time  and two-time .

In 1999, she was inducted into Canadian Curling Hall of Fame together with all of the Sandra Schmirler team.

Teams and events

Record as a coach of club teams

Record as a coach of national teams

Private life
Anita Ford is from a family of curlers. Her husband Gary (died 2004) was a four-time Saskatchewan men's curling champion from 1968 to 1971. They have two daughters, both of which are also curlers, Atina Ford and Cindy Simmons. Atina is an Olympic and Canadian champion, and sometime part of the Schmirler team.

References

External links
 
Anita Ford – Curling Canada Stats Archive
 1998 Sandra Schmirler Curling Team – Saskatchewan Sports Hall of Fame

Living people
1947 births
Curlers from Regina, Saskatchewan
Canadian women curlers
World curling champions
Canadian women's curling champions
Canadian curling coaches
20th-century Canadian women